Upper Gotvand Dam, or simply the Gotvand Dam, is an embankment dam on the Karun River about  northeast of Gotvand in Khuzestan Province, Iran. It currently has an installed capacity of 1,000 MW with another 1,000 MW in the works for a second phase. Studies for the Karun River began in the 1960s and specific designs on the Upper Gotvand were presented in 1967, 1975 and 1982. After the design and location were chosen, a further study was carried out in 1997, the same year preliminary construction (roads, bridges, river diversion) began. The river was diverted by April 2003 and excavation began soon thereafter. After completion of the dam, impounding of its reservoir began on 30 July 2011 during a ceremony attended by Iranian President Mahmood Ahmadinejad. The first generator of phase one was commissioned on 5 May 2012, two more by 18 September 2012 and the final in November 2012. Ahmadinejad was again present for the dam's inauguration on 22 April 2013. Phase 2 is estimated to be complete in 2015 and the dam is going to become one of Iran's largest power stations and is already its tallest earth-fill dam.

See also 

 List of power stations in Iran

References 

Hydroelectric power stations in Iran
Dams in Khuzestan Province
Dams completed in 2012
Dams on the Karun River
2012 establishments in Iran
Energy infrastructure completed in 2012
Earth-filled dams
Gotvand County